Annaghminnon Rovers GFC is a Gaelic football club from the small community of Stonetown in the parish of Louth, in County Louth. Founded in 1959, the club's colours are white and red (white jersey with red hoop).

History
Following Louth's 1957 All Ireland win, a need arose in the area to form a club and meetings took place in 1958 in the town land of Annaghminnon. The club was finally granted affiliation after several failed attempts in 1959. The club's maiden championship was achieved in 1964 after a narrow victory of John Mitchells and the team was managed by Jim Quigley who had previously led Louth's All Ireland campaign seven years previously. Championship success would not follow for another 36 years until 2000, when Rovers beat Tullyallens Glen Emmet’s by 2 points to lift the Christy Bellew JFC cup.

Annaghminnon has spent the majority of its footballing life in the junior ranks of Louth football with a brief two-year period in the intermediate grade in 2001 and 2002. For the years 2012-2018 the club regraded to the reserve divisions. In 2019, Annaghminnon Rovers regraded to the junior ranks. 

The club football field, dressing rooms and community hall are situated in Stonetown, near Dundalk in County Louth. Pairc Annachminnon was opened in 1987, the community hall was erected in 1991, and new dressing rooms were constructed in 2008.

Pairc Annachminnon is also home to Monaghan GAA club Magheracloone Mitchell's under a unique ground-sharing collaboration. This was agreed between both clubs after Magheracloone lost their playing grounds due to a collapsed gypsum mine underneath.

Honours
 Louth Junior Football Championship (2): 1964, 2000
 John Roe Cup (1): 2009
 Louth Junior 2B Football Championship (1): 2016

References

Gaelic games clubs in County Louth
Gaelic football clubs in County Louth